Stanislav Andreyevich Antipin (born 17 February 1995) is a Russian football player. He plays for FC Yenisey Krasnoyarsk.

Club career
He made his debut in the Russian Professional Football League for FC Krasnodar-2 on 31 August 2013 in a game against FC Volgar Astrakhan.

He made his Russian Football National League debut for FC Shinnik Yaroslavl on 4 November 2017 in a game against FC Rotor Volgograd.

References

1995 births
People from Tyumen
Sportspeople from Tyumen Oblast
Living people
Russian footballers
Association football goalkeepers
FC Krasnodar-2 players
FC Zenit-Izhevsk players
FC Shinnik Yaroslavl players
FC Volgar Astrakhan players
FC Tyumen players
FC Yenisey Krasnoyarsk players
Russian First League players
Russian Second League players